Sheldon Thomas may refer to:

 Sheldon Thomas (activist) (born 1964), English activist
 Sheldon Thomas (footballer) (born 1972), Trinidadian footballer